Gary Jeshel Forrester (born 3 July 1946) is a musician, composer, novelist, poet, short-story writer, biographer, memoirist,  academic, and historian based in Rotoiti Forest, New Zealand.  He was profiled by Random House Australia (Australian Country Music, 1991) as one of the major figures in the Australian music scene during the 1980s and 1990s, and in New Zealand by FishHead: Wellington's Magazine as a "modern Renaissance man." In a 2018 interview with New Zealand's leading newspaper, Forrester was described by the Sunday Star-Times as "a Native American descendant, on his mother's side ... who settled in New Zealand in 2006. [He is] a published author and poet and has released three solo albums in the past three years."

According to Fishhead, in addition to his teaching fellowship lecturing in legal ethics at the Victoria University of Wellington Law School from 2008 to 2016, Forrester had published "three novels and a book of poems, [was] a successful bluegrass composer and musician, an advocate for indigenous rights, and a father of six children." He taught at the University of Melbourne from 1976 to 1980, at the Northwestern School of Law in Oregon from 1983 to 1985, at Deakin University from 1991 to 1992, at the University of Illinois from 2000 to 2003, and (as noted) at Victoria University of Wellington from 2008 to 2016.

Beginning in the 1980s, he represented Indian tribes in securing restoration legislation through the United States Congress; authored a text on American Indian law; and wrote numerous articles on the rights of indigenous peoples, the environment, civil procedure, and other legal topics.

Strangers To Us All: Lawyers and Poetry (featuring biographies and works of poets and writers who have a legal background) declared that "Forrester is a hard man to pigeon-hole. He has practiced law, taught law, and spent time away from the legal profession. He is a singer, musician, poet, and writer."

Bluegrass, Folk, and Americana music 

Forrester's musical compositions were recorded (under his "nom de guitar" Eddie Rambeaux) on the albums Dust on the Bible (RCA Records, 1987), Uluru (Larrikin Records, 1988) and Kamara (Troubadour Records, 1990). Between 2015 and 2018, Forrester issued his first three solo albums, Alma Rose, Jeshel, and The Old Churchyard (Te Ahumairangi Records), featuring 30 new compositions.

In 1988, Forrester's single "Uluru" was featured on two national commemorative albums by the Australian Broadcasting Corporation (the ABC), as "the cream of a very rich mix" of Australian country music. The ABC observed: "Like our landscape, the history of Australia is best told by our poets, and this recording offers a unique slice... of our bushland, our people, our dreams, and our extraordinary sense of humour."

Forrester's music also appeared on the Larrikin Records 1996 composite album, Give Me a Home Among the Gum Trees, along with Australian country-folk icons Eric Bogle, Judy Small, The Bushwackers, and others.

Random House Australia's 1991 profile declared that "the most striking aspect of the albums, apart from their frequency, is the exceptionally high standard of songwriting." Australian Country Music observed that the bluegrass band fronted by Forrester (as lead singer and guitarist), the Rank Strangers, "have a musical immediacy that typifies the best of bluegrass and recalls such players as The Stanley Brothers and Bill Monroe."

According to Country Beat, Australia's country music journal, Dust on the Bible was "one of the best bluegrass-country albums released in Australia" in 1987, and Forrester was "one of the best songwriters living in Australia." In December 1988, Mike Jackson of The Canberra Times wrote that the Rank Strangers' second album, Uluru (the Aboriginal name for Australia's central Ayers Rock), "featured some delightful lead breaks on mandolin (Andrew Hook), banjo (Peter Somerville) and fiddle (Gerry Hale), and some rock-solid accompaniment from guitarist (Forrester) and bass player (Philomena Carroll)." Jackson said that the album was "worth buying for the fiddle playing alone. Hale shows great technique and a flair for appropriate harmony lines while matching the punch of the mandolin and banjo well."

In 1988, the Rank Strangers swept the Australian Gospel Music Awards in Tamworth, New South Wales, winning Best Group, Best Male Vocalist, and Best Composition. In 1989 and 1990, Dust on the Bible and Uluru were finalists (top five) in the overall Australian Country Music Awards (ACMA). The Rank Strangers were edged out in 1989 in ACMA's "best new talent" category by future country star James Blundell, and in 1990 in ACMA's "song of the year" category by country legend Smoky Dawson. In 1990, the Rank Strangers finished second in the world (to a Czech band) in an international competition sponsored by the International Bluegrass Music Association (IBMA), Nashville, Tennessee. 

Forrester led the Rank Strangers on tours of Australia and America, sharing billings with bluegrass legends Bill Monroe, Alison Krauss, Ralph Stanley, Emmylou Harris, Tony Rice, Peter Rowan, and many others. The American tour included "successful appearances at the Station Inn in Nashville [with country-folk icon Townes Van Zandt] and the IBMA Fan Fest in Owensboro, Kentucky," as well as headlining at the Louisville Bluegrass and American MusicFest in Kentucky, then "the largest [acoustic] music festival in the USA."

Bluegrass Unlimited, the oldest and most influential journal of bluegrass music (based in Warrenton, Virginia), declared that "the Rank Strangers have a unique angle on bluegrass music, and ought to be proud of making their own brand of music come out on top in the Land Down Under." BU described Uluru as "one of the most intellectually stimulating bluegrass works of recent years, and it cannot be restricted to mere national boundaries." The Rank Strangers were the subject of a feature article in the December 1988 issue of Bluegrass Unlimited. In a 2011 retrospective, BU featured the career of the Rank Strangers' banjo guru Peter Somerville, and recalled Forrester as "an excellent songwriter" of "challenging original material."

Britain's country music newspaper, International Country Music News, noting the band's successes at Australia's National Country Music Festival in Tamworth, New South Wales, found the compositions contained "archetypal elements of nostalgia, humour and religion", as well as themes that were "contemporary and Australian in influence." International music critic Eberhard Finke, writing in the German magazine Bluegrass-Bühne, identified the source of some of the compositions: "In 1987 when his grandfather died in Illinois, he put his grief into writing songs. Not that they are sad songs – there are swinging happy ones, with plenty of religious overtones that brought him closer to his grandfather's legacy. He tuned his guitar to double drop-D, DADGBD, making the G-run more difficult, but better suiting his words and melodies."

Music critic Jeff Harford, writing in the Otago Daily Times, reviewed Forrester's 2015–2017 solo material as follows: "For every nugget of truth in a great song, a corresponding seam of life experience is commonly found in its writer", and "Forrester brings a hatful of both to this Americana-folk release. The composer, novelist, poet, academic, and legal advocate for indigenous peoples takes a sideways step from his bluegrass past with the Rank Strangers to deliver a no-frills set that is, for the most part, nothing more than the man, his guitar and harmonica. That his ... originals sit comfortably alongside covers of Bob Dylan, Nanci Griffith and Gillian Welch songs says much about their strength."

Music critic Colin Morris, writing in Wellington's The Dominion Post, wrote that "Forrester is a damn fine guitar picker .. with an innate sense of rhythm coupled with fine lyrics and a story to tell. His Rosa Sharon is redolent of Johnny Cash singing Hurt. Seek it out."

In a 5-star (out of 5) review of Forrester's 2017 double CD, Jeshel, Mike Alexander of The Sunday Star-Times (New Zealand's largest Sunday newspaper) wrote: "There's something almost serendipitous about Jeshel Forrester posting his latest album with little or no fanfare. He's one of those people you might meet only to find that beyond the lack of self-important promotion, his life's work, influence and achievements are those of someone who has already left a footprint (as an activist, academic, novelist, poet and musician). As a reference point only, Forrester evokes the ghosts of preelectric Dylan, whose Girl of The North Country he covers, early Johnny Cash and the melodic sensibilities of Willie Nelson and Kris Kristofferson. There are simple narratives on Jeshel, which includes songs from his previous album Alma Rose, such as The Ballad Of Polly Kincaid and Koori Man, where the story is left to leave its own impression, more personal songs such as Rest For The Weary and the almost confessional Black Top Road and a few covers by Dylan, Gillian Welch, Nancy Griffith and Buddy and Julie Anne Miller. Forrester's music is simple and down-to-earth, just straightforward honesty. What surprises is that there are no swines among these 25 pearls."

James Belfield, the music critic for New Zealand's weekly current affairs magazine, the New Zealand Listener, described Jeshel as a "stunning double album of country folk", evoking "relentless storytelling skills" – the "easy acoustic strum and fingerpicking drift behind a clear, authoritative voice that tells outlaw country tales the equal of those by Waylon Jennings, Kris Kristofferson, Willie Nelson and Johnny Cash." Belfield wrote that "dates stand out like beacons – the 1866 cavalry massacre in the Battle of the Hundred in the Hand in the Crazy Horse history lesson Hoka Hey, the 1961 tension between the Bible and the indigenous sun dances in Hannah Cried, the 1945 return from war of the doomed Blue Eyed Boy – but it's the realism and vitality of the characters that loom largest."

NZ Musician, New Zealand's only magazine devoted to the national music scene, described the 2017 album Jeshel as "packed with well-written and performed songs", and noted that "Forrester has had an intriguing career in and out of the music industry, recording country albums in Australia in the mid-1980s, both as a solo artist and as part of the award-winning Rank Strangers." The "stand out" songs included "Hoka Hey, which tells the story of Crazy Horse, and Bob Dylan's Girl of the North Country."

NZ Musician described Forrester's solo compositions as "lovely" and "surprisingly complex": "With a steely yet gentle voice that at times reminds me of Johnny Cash or Leonard Cohen, Forrester's neatly constructed songs and dulcet tones will lull you along his album's entirety. His lyrics have an aged air, the word choices interesting without being corny or melodramatic. Stories range over a lot of topics and he uses nice rhyme schemes that don't follow his finger patterns. His rhyme and rhythm provide plenty to listen to in an uncomplicated way, the choice of chords, and the mixture of major and minor shapes come together beautifully without being something heard before – despite this being folk music. Choruses build nicely and verses flow down like rivers. A lovely, surprisingly complex album."

An article in the Sunday Star-Times praised the "sparseness and emotional directness of the storytelling on the exquisite Jeshel", and stated that the songs "mesmerisingly weave their own stories." The article referred to the Native American and Aboriginal themes in many of the songs, and quoted Forrester as follows: "When I went to law school, I was motivated by Martin Luther King and how the law could be used as a tool for social justice. Working with the Lakota tribe in America was a natural extension of that original thinking ... to do things for people who need the law to be on their side to make any progress."

In 2018, Forrester released his third solo album, The Old Churchyard. The Sunday Star-Times rated The Old Churchyard as a 4.5-star album (out of 5), stating that "Forrester is a throwback, in the most respectful way, to a time when songwriters had something to say and were armed with just an acoustic guitar and a suitcase full of songs. Think early Bob Dylan or Johnny Cash and a smattering of Glen Campbell or Jim Croce. The likes of them are still around but harder to find in the body electric of contemporary music. What makes Forrester so compelling is, aside from some beautifully accomplished guitar work, that he possess a voice that is melodic, warm and fragile." Noting Forrester's background as "academic, poet, lawyer, nomad, activist, author and troubadour," the review found that he "seamlessly weaves his life experiences" into his songs with words that are "timely and universal, touching on themes such as domestic abuse, unrequited love, and personal anguish."

NZ Musician magazine declared that The Old Churchyard was "in the same vein as late-career Johnny Cash – bare bones recordings of a bared heart." NZ Musician noted that Forrester's Martin D-28S guitar "sounds almost like a Carter Family autoharp on [the title track], lending the song a back-porch authenticity. The original songs really tell a story, a la Cohen, Dylan, or Skyscraper Stan. The key to this collection is the premise of a stroll through a rural graveyard populated by the spirits of friends, family and imagined persons of influence. The songs are a deliberate throwback in time, with the freedom to pen a fresh, mostly American mid-west history to the names found on those gravestones. Overall, the tone is downbeat, often just flat-out sad and weary. But there’s also a little dark humour. For example, in the song "Leo & Sam," Forrester conjures old cautionary epics such as Frankie and Johnny. Given the sparseness of his musical arrangements, it's a testimony to the allegorical lyrics and appeal of Forrester's voice that listener interest is easily maintained throughout."

David Thorpe, writing in the McLeod Newsletter, agreed: "Accompanying himself on a Martin D-28S guitar, impeccably picked and sounding effortless, Jeshel's voice is wizened and smooth, the songs varied but of a consistent quality, from gentle love songs to ballads and traditional songs.

In 2018, Forrester joined with Talei Shirley to form The Dunning-Kruger Effect, an acoustic duo, which recorded the album, "... and with no craven." (The Dunning-Kruger Effect, in psychology, is a cognitive bias in which people of low ability have delusions of superiority, and mistakenly assess their abilities as greater than they are.) The album features historical songs from ancient England, Ireland, Scotland, and Scandinavia, as well as idiosyncratic versions of more recent folk songs. Mike Byrne of the McLeod Newsletter described "... and with no craven" as "melancholic and elegaic ... The delivery of these songs is near perfect. Talei has a gentle and cadenced voice, and the guitar accompaniment is intimate and knowing."

On 26 April 2020, while in isolation during New Zealand's COVID-19 lockdown, Forrester put together a new solo acoustic album of 11 original songs and 2 covers, for non-commercial release on the Bandcamp online music streaming website. During the lockdown, the only available recording device at his lakeside cabin was a cell phone, so the new collection of songs was titled "The Covid Phone Album."

Novels, poetry, biography, memoir, and stories 

Following the demise of the Rank Strangers in the 1990s, Forrester turned to writing novels and poetry, with a focus on music and family. Houseboating in the Ozarks (Dufour Editions, 2006), which includes fictional accounts of a bluegrass band, is the story of a circular journey through the American Midwest, with reflective detours to Australia, South America, Japan, and Italy. Houseboating in the Ozarks meanders through tribal and Western spiritual traditions, including those of Aboriginal Australia and Lakota sundances in Green Grass, South Dakota, led by Yuwipi medicine man Frank Fools Crow. The St. Louis Post-Dispatch found Houseboating in the Ozarks idiosyncratic but engaging: an autobiographical "extended meditation on the difficulty of preserving familial and social memory, and sustaining and transmitting values and culture in our mobile, throwaway society."

A 2012 review of Houseboating said that "one of the many wonders of the book is that [the main character's] two kids become real people capable of influencing the outcome of the trip. They grab him by the heart and throw him around.  They are bright, funny, and embody their own kind of irony that meshes with Dad's . . . a wonderful, smart, sad book."  Lawyers and Poetry described Houseboating in the Ozarks as "autobiographical in the sense that Robert Pirsig's Zen and the Art of Motorcycle Maintenance is about the life of Robert Pirsig."

His second novel, The Connoisseur of Love, was published in New Zealand in 2012. This novel contains 12 meditations – a dozen episodes from the endgame of Peter Becker, Wellington's self-styled "connoisseur of love."  Peter is not quite at home in his adopted city of Wellington, but there is no place on earth he would rather be. He is a creature of routine, an eccentric public servant, estranged from his only child Katrin and his ex-wife Sylvia. Alone, he stalks Wellington's second-hand shops and cafés, bicycles through its streets and lanes, battles on its tennis courts, and performs his music – never quite connecting with anyone or anything.

FishHead: Wellington's Magazine described The Connoisseur of Love as a "comprehensive love song" to New Zealand's capital city, which "exudes Wellington." According to FishHead, "it's not just a novel about Wellington, it's a novel for Wellington." A review in the Emerging Writers Network declared Connoisseur to be "smartly written in Forrester's straightforward clear sentences which have always had the echo of Vonnegut", and that the novel created "a unique point of view that is so broad it is at once a Gordian knot of irony, a psychological landscape, and a state of mind."

In a feature article in Wellington's Dominion Post newspaper, Forrester was described as "a lawyer, public servant, bluegrass musician, and author of a novel set in Wellington.  But on paper it's being a writer that counts." The Dominion Post article captured Peter Becker's sense of alienation, observing that Forrester "made Peter Becker up and planted him as an outsider in Wellington, stumbling through familiar places and unsatisfactory relationships – Peter Becker is an alien in Wellington.  He doesn't pretend to be a Wellingtonian.  He has his nose pressed against the glass."

The Germans have a word for Peter Becker's underlying sense that all is not well: Torschlusspanik – literally, "gate-closing panic" – or in Peter's case, the quiet angst of aging as life's options narrow. Not that long ago, he seemed to have all the time in the world; now his world is shrinking, and grace has not arrived.

Begotten, Not Made, Forrester's third novel, recounts the travels of a wandering musician and his deaf sidekick, shuffling along on a doomed walking marathon from New York to San Francisco in the 1920s. A lengthy extract from Begotten, Not Made was published in 2007 by the University of Nebraska Press, in Scoring from Second, an anthology featuring the works of "thirty accomplished writers" from North America, including Michael Chabon, Andre Dubus, and others. Begotten, Not Made is written "entirely in free verse in the voice of a demented Brer Rabbit."

Forrester's fourth novel, More Deaths than One, was published in 2014 in a special edition of The Legal Studies Forum, a journal established by the American Legal Studies Association to promote humanistic, critical, trans-disciplinary legal studies, and featuring works of poetry, essays, memoirs, stories, and criticism. More Deaths than One is a picaresque journey from New Zealand to America, in search of the Central Illinois roots of the late novelist David Foster Wallace, the 21st century cultural paradigm known as Metamodernism, and the meaning of life. According to the New Zealand writer and poet Jillian Sullivan, More Deaths than One "is amazing; so beautifully cadenced and such clear, intelligent writing. It reads like a classic. It is one man's honest and vulnerable take on life (and an intelligent, educated, thoughtful take)."

Poems from Forrester's 2009 New Zealand book of verse, The Beautiful Daughters of Men: A Novella in Short Verse from Tinakori Hill, have appeared in prominent journals including the South Dakota Review, Poetry New Zealand, JAAM (Just Another Art Movement), the Earl of Seacliffe Art Workshop, and Voyagers: A New Zealand Science Fiction Poetry Anthology. The complete poems were published in January 2009, in The Legal Studies Forum. The Beautiful Daughters is the tale of two migrants to New Zealand, a woman from Chechnya and a dying man.

In 2011, Forrester's initial memoir, Blaw, Hunter, Blaw Thy Horn, was published in America. In a review, the Quincy Herald-Whig described the book as "a memoir and historical commentary on the lives of his parents, Harry and Rose, and what impacted the family during their stays in various parts of west-central, central, and southern Illinois." The Herald-Whig's review observed that Harry Forrester, coach of the men's basketball team at Quincy College (now Quincy University) from 1954 to 1957, "eventually earned as much respect for his decision to play five black players as he did for leading the Hawks to their first national tournament appearance."  The Herald-Whig's review noted that "Harry Forrester did not spend much time in Quincy, but it's safe to say his impact will be remembered forever", recalling that his landmark coaching decision "came at the height of racial insensitivity in the mid-to-late 1950s and was a full decade before Texas Western (now UTEP) started five black players in what is now the NCAA Division I national championship game. A movie was made about that Texas Western team, but outside of Quincy, only a handful of people to this day realize history was first made [by Forrester and his players] in West-Central Illinois."

A review of Blaw, Hunter in the Effingham Daily News observed that most of the memoir takes place in the first half of the twentieth century "in the small slice of Illinois centered in Montgomery and Christian counties – in towns like Raymond, Harvel, and Morrisonville", but that Forrester's memoir also "reaches back to the 16th century and his Melungeon ancestors."

Forrester's story "A Kilgore Trout Moment" appeared in The Legal Studies Forum in 2010.  The story is the whimsical tale of an oddball poet who contributes to a baseball writing conference in Tennessee, suffering near-death experiences and failures to communicate along the way, only to find redemption, at last, at "home."  In 2012, Forrester's story "Tulips" was also featured in The Legal Studies Forum.

In 2018, Forrester's biography of the late writer Philip F. Deaver, "One Dog Barked, the Other Howled," was published in a special edition of The Legal Studies Forum.

In 2019, Forrester's book "Dave Thorp as Metaphor," a light-hearted history of Rotorua's iconic McLeods bookstore, was published by McLeods Booksellers Ltd for distribution nationally throughout New Zealand.

Representation of US Indian tribes 

Forrester, a descendant (on his mother's side) of Cherokee tribal members and Appalachian Melungeons, learned bluegrass music in the early 1980s from two members of the Lakota tribe, Cheeto Mestes (1928-2018) and Mervin Frazier (1935-2012), while defending Indian tribal rights in South Dakota. During these years, while living on the Cheyenne River Indian Reservation in Eagle Butte, South Dakota, he also advised members of the American Indian Movement, including activist Kenny Kane and others, and assisted Lakota clients, including Kane, Russell Means, Madonna Thunder Hawk, and spiritual leader Sidney Uses Knife Keith, prepare for interviews and participation in Peter Matthiessen's landmark 1983 book, In the Spirit of Crazy Horse.

As Director of the Native American Program for Oregon Legal Services (NAPOLS) in the mid-1980s, he represented several American Indian tribes, notably as tribal attorney assisting the Confederated Tribes of the Grand Ronde Community of Oregon and the Klamath Tribes before the United States Congress in securing federal legislation restoring treaty rights following generations of "termination." In advocating before Congress for the restoration of these tribal governments, he worked with activist (and later Congresswoman) Elizabeth Furse, tribal leaders Kathryn Harrison (Grand Ronde) and Charles Kimball (Klamath), Congressman Les AuCoin, and Senators Mark Hatfield and Ted Kennedy.

Forrester represented Indian clients in a number of litigated cases, including State v. Charles (custody of Indian child under the Indian Child Welfare Act); Medberry v. Hegstrom (Klamath Tribe's rights under Indian Claims Commission); Red Bird v. Meierhenry (unemployment statutes must be strictly construed in favor of Indian claimant); and Quiver v. Deputy Assistant Secretary, Indian Affairs (collection and distribution of Klamath lease payments under Indian trust allotments).  He also argued successfully before Judges Richard Posner, Diane Wood, and Daniel Anthony Manion in the United States Court of Appeals for the Seventh Circuit in Cavalieri v. Shepard, establishing that where the police were "deliberately indifferent" to a prisoner's health and safety, they had violated his constitutional rights (where the former prisoner was now in a permanent vegetative state following a suicide attempt behind bars). The Seventh Circuit in Cavalieri further held that the police were not entitled to "qualified immunity", as the law regarding "deliberate indifference" had been established before the attempted suicide, so the police were on notice that their conduct was unconstitutional.  Following the Seventh Circuit's decision, Forrester successfully opposed the writ of certiorari filed on behalf of the police in the U.S. Supreme Court.

His 1990 text Digest of American Indian Law: Cases and Chronology (republished in 2012 by William S. Hein & Co. as part of its online American Indian Library) derived from his Oregon lectures at the Northwestern School of Law in Portland. He also taught law at the University of Melbourne, the University of Illinois in Champaign-Urbana, Deakin University, and Victoria University of Wellington, and wrote extensively on indigenous rights and other matters.

Forrester was given the honorary Lakota name "Jeshel" (meaning both "meadowlark" and "messenger") following an unusual incident at a sundance in Green Grass, South Dakota, in the summer of 1981. During piercing day, which was guided by Yuwipi medicine man Frank Fools Crow, a meadowlark glided down to Forrester's shoulder from the tall cottonwood Sun Pole at the center of the sundance circle. Fools Crow paused at the cauldron, and quietly bestowed the name Jeshel. The sundance continued. In 2014, Forrester changed his first name, officially under New Zealand law, to Jeshel.

Life 

Forrester was born in Decatur, Illinois, "the soy-bean capital of the world." He grew up in Effingham, Quincy, and Tuscola in central Illinois, but spent most of his adult life overseas.

His father Harry Forrester (1922–2008), an Irish-American basketball and baseball coach, was inducted into the Quincy University Hall of Fame and the Illinois Basketball Coaches Hall of Fame for his ground-breaking work on behalf of African-American athletes in the racially segregated 1950s. His mother Alma Rose Grundy (1922–2009), a primary school teacher and piano player of European, American Indian, and Melungeon descent, came from a line of musicians on her mother's side that included the German-American fiddler Otto Funk, who gained an entry as "the Walking Fiddler" in the Guinness Book of World Records for playing his Hopf violin every step of the way from New York to San Francisco in 1929, a marathon of 4,165 miles. (The "Walking Fiddler's" journey was chronicled in Forrester's second novel, Begotten, Not Made.) On her father's side, Alma Rose Grundy's ancestors included the abolitionist crusader Miner Steele Gowin, a Melungeon who operated an Underground Railroad safe house in Jersey County, Illinois, for escaping slaves; his wife Nancy Beeman, descended from Cherokee Indians from Georgia, also helped to operate the Jersey County safe house.

After graduating from Tuscola High School in 1964, Forrester worked his way through university by farming, life-guarding, and stacking bottles at a Kraft Food plant. He became a conscientious objector and anti-war activist during the Vietnam War, and performed alternative service in the Peace Corps teaching mathematics in Guyana, South America.

Following a BSc degree in Mathematics, Forrester was awarded a Master of Arts degree in English Literature with a thesis on Applications of the Halle-Keyser Theories of Metrical Stress to Beowulf and Chaucer. He then obtained a Juris Doctor degree from the University of Illinois College of Law, where he served as an editor on the law review. He worked for Judge Henry Seiler Wise as a law clerk in the U.S. District Court for the Eastern District of Illinois, before emigrating to Australia where he taught at the University of Melbourne and befriended Aboriginal leader Brian Kamara Willis in Alice Springs. Through Kamara Willis, Forrester became interested in the rights of indigenous peoples, and left Australia in 1980 to work on Indian reservations in the states of South Dakota and Oregon in the USA. (The album Kamara is dedicated to the memory of Kamara Willis.) In 1984 he joined Oregon native Mindy Leek in supporting the final presidential campaign of South Dakota's Senator George McGovern.

Upon the successful restoration of Oregon's Grand Ronde and Klamath tribes, Forrester wrote his book on Indian law and returned to Australia to form the Rank Strangers and represent Aboriginal clients and others. He was also politically active, advising Australian Democrats leaders Senator Don Chipp and Senator Janine Haines in regard to the Aboriginal Affairs portfolio and the Democrats' successful campaign to save the Franklin River in Tasmania.

Throughout the 1990s, with the assistance of international WWOOFERS ("Willing Workers on Organic Farms"), Forrester (a vegetarian) and his family (including six children) operated a communal  organic farm in an Australian eucalypt forest in the Shire of Hepburn, Victoria, based on principles developed by permaculture designer and fellow Shire of Hepburn resident David Holmgren. During this time, he also worked with Father Bob Maguire on behalf of homeless children in Melbourne, studied theology under Veronica Lawson RSM at the Australian Catholic University, lectured in law at Deakin University (1991–92), and wrote weekly newspaper columns in Central Victoria.

In 2000, Forrester accepted a professorship at the Law School of the University of Illinois. In 2006, following the completion of his first two novels and several years of anti-war protests against the USA's invasion of Iraq, he and his family left America to live on Tinakori Hill in Wellington, New Zealand, where he wrote the poems collected in The Beautiful Daughters of Men, his memoir Blaw, Hunter, Blaw Thy Horn, and his Wellington novels, The Connoisseur of Love and More Deaths than One.

From 2007 to 2016, he served as a Teaching Fellow at Victoria University of Wellington, lecturing in ethics, contract law, and writing. He also provided legal advice and representation to the Wellington Community Law Centre and various public service organisations.

Australia's longest-running defamation suit 

In 1990, Forrester led a group of eleven public service colleagues in mounting legal and political challenges to improprieties and mismanagement within the State of Victoria's accident compensation scheme, known at the time as "WorkCare." Approximately 25 court cases were lodged, based on allegations of racism, workplace espionage by WorkCare's fraud investigations unit, and other improprieties. Following airing of these grievances in the Victorian parliament on 29 March 1990, and a nationally screened report by ABC television on 31 July 1990, the management of Victoria's Accident Compensation Commission (ACC) mounted Australia's longest-running defamation case, against the ABC, in Victoria's Supreme Court.

Victoria's State Ombudsman found that an ACC general manager had ordered one of his fraud investigators, Gary Mutimer, to spy on the ACC's chairman Professor Ronald Sackville. Spy operations were also carried out against John Halfpenny, secretary of the Victorian Trades Hall Council, an ex-offico member of the ACC board.

Following repeated urgings by Supreme Court Justice David Byrne, the ACC/ABC defamation case eventually settled on 28 March 1992, when the ABC issued an "apology" to the ACC's former managing director and two other managers. However, the ABC declined to pay any financial compensation to the three, and the ABC's chairman, David Hill, told the Australian Senate that the apology was simply a "commercial decision." The case had cost the taxpayers of Victoria over two million dollars in legal costs.

In separate litigation in the Federal Court of Australia, Forrester was awarded a six-figure settlement by the ACC in November 1992. In a case before the Equal Opportunity Board, Forrester's colleague, African-born lawyer Dr. Nii Wallace-Bruce, received $33,000 in costs in July 1991, in the course of settling his claims of racism and other improprieties. Gary Mutimer was awarded compensation for stress caused by being required to carry out improper surveillance operations on Professor Sackville. The ACC general manager who had ordered the spying operations submitted his resignation from ACC in March 1990. On 25 July 1991, the ACC's managing director was removed from office by Victoria's State Government.

Literary treatment 

Forrester's life has been fictionalized, as the character "Skidmore", in the works of Philip F. Deaver (1946–2018).  Deaver's stories were collected in his book Silent Retreats, which won the 1986 Flannery O'Connor Award for Short Fiction. See . Individual stories from Silent Retreats, featuring Deaver's Skidmore character, were also recognized in the 1988 Prize Stories: The O. Henry Awards and in 1995's Best American Short Stories.

Selected bibliography 
 
 
 
 
  (with H. Barry Holt); republished in 2012 by William S. Hein & Co. as part of its online American Indian Library (https://www.wshein.com/; https://www.wshein.com/blog/).
 More Deaths than One (novel). The Legal Studies Forum, Volume XXXVIII, No. 2, West Virginia University (2014) (special edition).
 "Begotten, Not Made" (excerpt from novel), in: 
 "The Beautiful Daughters of Men: A Novella in Short Verse from Tinakori Hill." The Legal Studies Forum, Volume XXXIII, Supplement No. 2, West Virginia University (2009),  (a journal established by the American Legal Studies Association to promote humanistic, critical, trans-disciplinary writing, and featuring works of poetry, essays, memoirs, stories, and criticism).
 "A Kilgore Trout Moment" (story). The Legal Studies Forum, Volume XXXIV, No. 2, West Virginia University (2010), .
 "Tulips" (story). The Legal Studies Forum, Volume XXXV, West Virginia University (2012), .
 "One Dog Barked, the Other Howled: A Meditation on Several Lives of Philip Deaver" (biography). The Legal Studies Forum, Volume XLII, Supp. 1, West Virginia University (2018) (special edition).

Selected discography 

Albums
Dust on the Bible. RCA (Nicholls and Dimes) (1988) (finalist, Australian Country Music Awards).
Back in Illinois
Jesus Is a Travelling Man (best vocalist, Australian Gospel Music Awards)
Hannah Cried
Dust on the Bible
A Hundred Miles an Hour to the Throne
Singing in the Family Circle
Matthew Chapter Three (best song, Australian Gospel Music Awards)
Elva
Greater Country 3UZ
Seventh Heaven (final five, "Best New Talent", Australia Country Music Awards)

Uluru. Larrikin Records (Australia) (1989) (finalist, Australian Country Music Awards).
Uluru (final five for song of the year, Australian Country Music Awards – based on the trial of Lindy and Michael Chamberlain)
TV Preacher
Grampa Grundy
JFK
Two Dollar Bill (a/k/a "Long Journey Home")
Alma Rose
Mekong
King O'Malley
Take Me Home
Ice in Her Veins
Rain and Snow (written by Dock Boggs)
Talking in Tongues

Kamara. Troubadour Records (Australia) (1990).
Love Please Come Home (written by Bill Monroe)
Kamara (based on the life of Aboriginal leader Brian Kamara Willis)
White Freight Liner (written by Townes Van Zandt)
East Virginia Blues (trad.)
Walking at Midnight
You've Got a Lover (written by Ricky Skaggs)
Come Home Angeline
Nella Dan (based on the story of the great Australian explorer ship)
Catfish John (written by Bob McDill and Alan Reynolds)
Ross River Fever
Rose Anne's Getting Married Today
Glendale Train (written by John Dawson)
Memories of Mother and Dad (written by Bill Monroe)

Alma Rose. Te Ahumairangi Studios (New Zealand) (2015) (https://garyforrestermusic.bandcamp.com/album/alma-rose ).
Black Top Road
Rosa Sharon
Love at the Five & Dime (written by Nanci Griffith)
Careless
Koori Man
Anathea (traditional with new lyrics)
Lay Me Down
Eyes of Stone
Oliver Eastman
Weathergirl
Seeing Double
Girl of the North Country (written by Bob Dylan)
Scarlet Town (written by Gillian Welch)
Kamara
Alma Rose

Jeshel. Te Ahumairangi Studios (New Zealand) (2016) (https://jeshelforrestermusic.bandcamp.com/releases)
Rest for the Weary
Hoka Hey
Hannah Cried
Wide River to Cross (written by Buddy Miller and Julie Anne Miller)
Maurita Cortez
Selma's Waltz
The House Carpenter (traditional)
The Ballad of Polly Kincaid
Annabelle (written by Gillian Welch)
Blue Eyed Boy

The Old Churchyard. Sonorous Circle Studio (New Zealand) (2018) (https://jeshelforrestermusic.bandcamp.com/releases)
Raylene
Sally Corn
Joseph
Lester 
Amy Winehouse
Maude Gonne (words by W. B. Yeats, re-arranged)
Sam and Leo 
Danny (words by R. Kipling)
The Old Churchyard (Traditional)

... and with no craven, by The Dunning-Kruger Effect (Talei Shirley and Jeshel Forrester). Sonorous Circle Studio (New Zealand) (2018) (https://thedunning-krugereffect.bandcamp.com/releases)
Bonnie George Campbell (16th century Scottish ballad)
Can You Hear Me? (written by Justin Walshe)
Stand By Me (written by Ben E. King)
Little Bird (written by Lisa Hannigan)
The Death of Queen Jane (16th century English ballad) 
Donal Og (8th century Irish ballad)
I Will Follow You into the Dark (written by Ben Gibbard) 
Earl Brand (15th century Scandinavian ballad)
Boots of Spanish Leather (written by Bob Dylan)

The Covid Phone Album. Sonorous Circle Studio (New Zealand) (2020) (https://jeshelforrester.bandcamp.com)
Death of My Father
Answered Prayer
Reverie
Reckoning 
The Ballad of Dylan Thomas and Liz Reitell
The Town of Kilcullen
Wayfaring Stranger (Traditional) 
Daughter
Thelma
Woke
The Natural Kind
Cheeto Mestes
After the Gold Rush (written by Neil Young)

Composite Albums
 That's Australia. Larrikin Records (Australia) (1988) (composite album produced by ABC Television).
 Music Deli. Larrikin Records (Australia), Larrikin LRF 227 (1988) (composite album of music "borrowing from different traditions and creating new forms").
 Give Me a Home Among the Gum Trees. Larrikin Records, 1996.

Notes

External links 
 http://www.dufoureditions.com/
 http://www.crockheadabroad.blogspot.com (24 November 2006 entry)
 http://myweb.wvnet.edu/~jelkins/lp-2001/intro/contemp_pt1.html 
 http://www.crockheadabroad.blogspot.com (1 January 2007 entry)
 http://peacecorpsonline.org/messages/messages/467/2208463.html
 http://forresterfamily.org/index.php

1946 births
Living people
21st-century American novelists
21st-century American poets
American bluegrass musicians
American expatriates in Australia
American expatriates in New Zealand
American male novelists
American male poets
American country singer-songwriters
Eastern Illinois University alumni
Musicians from Champaign, Illinois
Musicians from Decatur, Illinois
Musicians from Melbourne
Native Americans' rights activists
Peace Corps volunteers
People from Tuscola, Illinois
People from Effingham, Illinois
People from Quincy, Illinois
People from Rotorua
People from Wellington City
University of Illinois Urbana-Champaign alumni
University of Illinois Urbana-Champaign faculty
Academic staff of the Victoria University of Wellington
Writers from Decatur, Illinois
New Zealand male writers
American male short story writers
Singer-songwriters from Illinois
New Zealand singer-songwriters
21st-century American short story writers
21st-century New Zealand musicians
21st-century American male writers
Novelists from Illinois
People from Eagle Butte, South Dakota
Country musicians from Illinois
Singer-songwriters from South Dakota